Yōzan Dirk W. Mosig (born 1943) is a psychologist, historian, literary critic and ordained Zen monk noted for his critical work on H. P. Lovecraft. He was born in Germany and lived for several years in Argentina before emigrating to the United States. He received his Ph.D at the University of Florida in 1974.

Between 1973 and 1978, Mosig published numerous important essays assessing Lovecraft's work.

To cite but three, Mosig's 1973 essay "Toward a Greater Appreciation of H.P. Lovecraft: The Analytical Approach" is a psychological interpretation (based on the theories of C.G. Jung) of many Lovecraft stories.

The pioneering and oft-reprinted "H. P. Lovecraft: Myth Maker" (1976) explores Lovecraft's philosophy of horror, takes issue with August Derleth's distorted interpretation of Lovecraft's myth-cycle and emphasises the latter's vision of an amoral cosmos in which humanity has little significance.

In "Lovecraft: The Dissonance Factor in Imaginative Literature" (1979), insanity is the result of a fatal cognitive dissonance in the protagonist caused by encounters with cosmic horrors that contradict the protagonist's (and the reader's) worldview of the universe and its laws.

Several of Mosig's essays assessed individual works by Lovecraft such as "The Outsider" and "The White Ship" according to a psychoanalytical perspective. One essay analysed Lovecraft's poem "The City".

S. T. Joshi has stated that "Dirk Mosig is the key transitional figure in Lovecraft studies; and if the history of this field is ever written, he will have to occupy a central role."

Mosig currently teaches psychology at the University of Nebraska at Kearney, where he is also engaged in research on the Punic Wars and the career of Hannibal.

The volume Mosig at Last: A Psychologist Looks at Lovecraft (West Warwick, RI: Necronomicon Press, August 1997) collects Mosig's previously published Lovecraft papers and adds some previously unpublished, such as "Life After Lovecraft: Reminiscences of a Non-Entity" (reflections on his life as a Lovecraft scholar). Also included is "Growing Up Lovecraftian" by Mosig's daughter, Laila Briquet-Mosig.

References

Further reading
 Peter Cannon "The Man Who Was Mosig." Crypt of Cthulhu 33 (Lammas 1985):36. Brief essay on Mosig's importance in Lovecraft studies. 
 Donald R. Burleson. "Fra Mosigus." Crypt of Cthulhu 33 (Lammas 1985): 37–38. A memoir of Mosig and a discussion of his importance in Lovecraft studies.
 Joshi, S.T. "Concluding Address". in Joshi, ed. The H.P. Lovecraft Centennial Conference: Proceedings. Warwick, RI: Necronomicon Press, March 1991, pp. 78–90. Reprint in Books at Brown 28/29 (1991–92): 149–56. Summarises the Lovecraft Centennial Conference (Providence, RI, 1990) and memorialises the prior figures (Robert H. Barlow, August Derleth, Dirk W. Mosig and others) who made Lovecraft's recognition possible.
 Joshi, S. T. "Mosig at Last: My Years with the Greatest of Lovecraft Scholars."Crypt of Cthulhu 33 (Lammas 1985):29-35, 23. Discusses Joshi's relations with Mosig and touches upon Mosig's significance in fostering understanding of Lovecraft.

External links
  Yozan Mosig page

1943 births
Living people
21st-century American psychologists
American literary critics
German emigrants to the United States
H. P. Lovecraft scholars
University of Nebraska at Kearney people
20th-century American psychologists